The Dartmoor Beast is an annual charitable fundraising challenge run in aid of the charity Cancer Climber Association (CCA) UK.  The challenge takes the form of a daytime navigation exercise held in the Dartmoor National Park in the county of Devon, England.  The challenge is usually held on a Saturday in late August or early September.  The Dartmoor Beast takes its name from the various big cat sightings that have been a recurring feature of local folklore in the Dartmoor, Exmoor and Bodmin Moor areas for many years and from the Royal Marine Commando speed march held during the final stages of qualification for the coveted Commando green beret.

Teams 
Teams of between 4 and 8 participants hike or 'yomp' either a 20 km or 30 km route across Dartmoor carrying a pack of either 10 kg or 15 kg respectively.  No prescribed route is laid down for teams entering the challenge, but various checkpoints must be visited at places around the moor.  Teams are left to plot and navigate their own route between checkpoints, making use of map, compass, map reading skills and global positioning systems.  Whilst the challenge is not a competition, a climate of friendly and sportsman like rivalry contributes to the sense of achievement for all teams participating in this race against the clock.

Loading 
Each individual participating in the challenge is required to carry a backpack of equipment aimed at ensuring safety whilst on the moor.  Adequate clothing, food and water must be carried by each team member, in addition to maps, first aid kit, torch and other important items.  The weight of each team member's backpack is checked at the start, finish and various points along the route, and time penalties are levied for every kg under the prescribed weight that each team member is found to be carrying.  In practice this means that the 10 kg or 15 kg must not include the weight of food and water that will be consumed en route.  Participants that are found to be carrying less than the required weight find their load increased by one or more of the many rocks that litter Dartmoor.

Navigation 
The Dartmoor National Park is notorious for being a difficult environment in which to navigate, especially if visibility is poor.  The moor often experiences extensive hill fog, or 'clag' as it is locally known, which combined with the absence of many linear features (such as walls, paths, fences, forest edges) provides a challenging test for even the most confident navigator.

Staffing 
In previous years the challenge has been staffed by volunteers from the Royal Marines Reserve (RMR) Bristol and representatives of the CCA.  The checkpoints provide an opportunity for RMR staff to assess the fitness, progress and morale of each team, ensuring their safety throughout the competition.

Rewards of participation 
Each team member who completes the challenge receives a completion certificate and prizes are awarded for the fastest team on the 20 km and 30 km routes and various other notable achievements.  The event culminates in a barbecue hosted by the RMR and CCA at the Fox and Hounds Public House, in Bridstowe, Devon - which acts as the start/finish and command post for the event.

See also 
Dartmoor Yomp

External links 
 Dartmoor Beast Website (archive 2006)
 Cancer Climber Association

Dartmoor
Health-related fundraisers
Charity events in the United Kingdom
Annual events in England
Events in Devon